Wanita Lynch (born 16 November 1958) is an Australian gymnast. She competed in five events at the 1976 Summer Olympics.

References

1958 births
Living people
Australian female artistic gymnasts
Olympic gymnasts of Australia
Gymnasts at the 1976 Summer Olympics
Place of birth missing (living people)
20th-century Australian women